Salmaniya is a neighborhood of Manama, Bahrain that houses the largest hospital in Bahrain, Salmaniya Medical Complex, and the Psychiatric Hospital (Bahrain). Also, other private hospitals operate within the vicinity such as the Royal Bahrain Hospital.

The neighborhood also houses many residential flats and apartments, as well as having many local supermarkets in the vicinity.

Neighborhoods of Manama